Type 26 may refer to:

 Peugeot Type 26, motor vehicle by the French auto-maker Peugeot
 Type 26 frigate, a future frigate of the Royal Navy
 Type 26 revolver, a revolver of the Imperial Japanese Army
 Type 26 Pillbox, a British WW II defence structure.